Rosalie Favell  (born 1958) is a Métis (Cree/British) artist from Winnipeg, Manitoba currently based in Ottawa, Ontario, working with photography and digital collage techniques. Favell creates self-portraits, sometimes featuring her own image and other times featuring imagery that represents her, often making use of archival photos of family members and images from pop culture.

Early life 
Rosalie Favell was born in 1958 to a Métis father named Gerald, and a mother of Scottish/English descent named Florence McFadyen. She was raised in an Anglican household where the family's ancestry was not openly discussed. Receiving her first camera at age ten, Favell first formally explored her artistic impulse a number of years later at a night photography course which inspired her to continue learning the medium.

Education 
Favell completed a bachelor of applied arts at Ryerson Polytechnic Institute in 1984, a master of fine arts at the University of New Mexico in 1998, and a PhD(ABD) in Cultural Mediations at Carleton University in 2009. In the late 1990s, when she was making a shift from documentary photography to digital photo manipulations, Favell learned from fellow artist Larry Glawson.

Rosalie Favell has taught many courses and workshops throughout her career. She has taught courses at the University of Manitoba (98-99), the Institute of American Indian Art Santa-Fe, (94-95), Carleton University, and the University of Ottawa, to name a few. Favell has also taught digital photography at Discovery University since 2013, a program run jointly by The Ottawa Mission and the University of Ottawa to offer people of low-income situations educational opportunities. Favell has done several residencies as well, including residencies at the Banff Centre, and the Nigig Visiting Artist Residency at OCAD University, where she presented the work Facing the Camera (2008-ongoing) that consisted of a series of portraits of members of the Indigenous arts community.

Involvement in organizations 
Favell was an early member of the NIIPA (Native Indian/Inuit Photographers’ Association) in Hamilton, the first artist-run centre specializing in photo-based artwork by Indigenous artists in Canada. She was a board member at the Floating Gallery Centre for Photography in Winnipeg and the Original Women's Network: a Native Women's Resource Centre. Favell has also worked with Nepalese women's groups in Katmandu.

Themes 
A prominent and ongoing theme in Favell's work is self-portraiture. Favell often references the traditions of portraiture and self-portraiture, using traditional composition or even existing portraits, and replacing the historical sitter with herself. An example of this is Favell's The Artist in Her Museum: The Collector (2005) that references Charles Wilson Peale's self-portrait displaying his collection, The Artist in His Museum (1822). In Favell's work she replaces the collector with her own image and the collection of specimens with her family photos, and in doing so questions and overwrites the colonial practice of collection and display. In her photo manipulations, Favell re-contextualizes specific portraits and the portrait tradition on a whole, often introducing her own Indigenous identity to create a dialogue. Fellow artist and writer Barry Ace summarizes Favell's approach by stating:

“The collected images act as an aide-memoire, igniting personal and collective memory, while photo-digital practice provides her with an expansive tableau for visual expressions of self, family, identity and sexuality.”

Favell has also created many works using documentary photography to create an image of the Indigenous community that she is a part of. Works such as Portraits in Blood (1980s) use photographic portraits of Indigenous artists and friends to express and document Favell's own navigation of Indigenous identity. Her ongoing Facing the Camera series, which began in 2008, consists of dynamic photographic portraits of roughly 450 Indigenous artists from across the globe including Daphne Odjig, Greg Hill, Bear Witness of A Tribe Called Red, Caroline Monnet, Heather Igloliorte, Kent Monkman, Mary Watt, Maree Clarke, Alex Janvier, and Mary Anne Barkhouse. The active poses that Favell captures in Facing the Camera lend agency to the sitters and call into question stereotypes created in part by a history of portraiture of Indigenous people from a colonial perspective.

Awards 
Favell has received recognition and support for her work through several awards and grants throughout her career. Favell was awarded the biennial Karsh Award in 2012 in recognition of her extensive body of photographic work, the Ontario Arts Council Chalmers Arts Fellowship in 2004, and the Canada Council for the Arts Victor Martyn Lynch-Staunton Award in 2003, to name a few. In 2017, Favell was awarded The Paul de Hueck and Norman Walford Career Achievement Award for Art Photography.

Works

Exhibited and collected works 
Favell's work has been exhibited at and collected by the National Gallery of Canada, the Canadian Museum of Contemporary Photography, Library and Archives Canada, the Ottawa Art Gallery, Karsh-Masson Gallery, Cube Gallery, the Smithsonian National Museum of the American Indian, and the Rockwell Museum of Western Art. An exhibition at the Canadian Museum of Contemporary Photography (National Gallery of Canada) called Steeling the Gaze: Portraits by Aboriginal Artists that challenged stereotypical portrayals of Indigenous people through portraiture featured Favell's work. Her portraits appeared alongside the work of other Indigenous artists such as KC Adams, Carl Beam, Dana Claxton, Thirza Cuthand, Kent Monkman, David Neel, Shelley Niro, Greg Staats, Jeff Thomas, and Bear Witness.

Group exhibitions 

 2013: Steeling the Gaze: Portraits by Aboriginal Artists, Mendel Art Gallery, Saskatoon, SK
 2019: Hearts of Our People: Native Women Artists, Minneapolis Institute of Art, Minneapolis, MN

Selected works 
 1994 Living Evidence
 1980s Portraits in Blood
 1998 Longing and Not Belonging
 2005 The Artist in Her Museum: The Collector
 1999-2006 Plain(s) Warrior Artist
 2010 Wish You Were Here
 2008-ongoing Facing the Camera

Collaborative projects and groups 
In 2017, Rosalie Favell organized a collaborative project called Wrapped in Culture which involved Indigenous artists from Canada: Favell herself, Barry Ace (Anishinaabe-Odawa), Meryl McMaster (Cree) and Adrian Stimson (Siksika-Blackfoot), and from Australia: Maree Clarke (Mutti Mutti, Yorta Yorta, Boon Wurrung), Vicki West (Tasmanian), Mitch Mahoney (Boon Wurrung, Barkindji), Molly Mahoney (Boon Wurrung, Barkindji), Kerri Clarke (Boon Wurrung), and Wade Mahoney (Barkindji). The ten artists created a traditional Blackfoot buffalo robe and an Australian Aboriginal possum skin cloak at workshops spanning a few weeks. The robes were incised and painted with designs in an act of storytelling, reclamation, and community building.

Rosalie Favell is part of the OO7 (Ottawa Ontario Seven) Collective, a group of Indigenous artists that includes Ariel Smith, Barry Ace, Frank Shebageget, Leo Yerxa, Michael Belmore, Ron Noganosh, and invited “special agents.” The group provides an alternative and experimental space for Ottawa-based Indigenous artists at different stages in their careers.

References

Further reading 
 Ace, Barry. 2007. Rituals of Collecting and Transformation: The Artistic Journeys of Rosalie Favell, BlackFlash, Vol. 24(3).
Ace, Barry and Rice, Ryan. 2000. "Rosalie Favell: Longing and not Belonging." CV: Photographie contemporaine 53(Winter 2000):23–30.
 Ash-Milby, Kathleen, ed. 2010. Hide: Skin as Material and Metaphor. New York: Smithsonian National Museum of the American Indian.
 Beatty, Greg. 2000. "Exposed: Aesthetics of Aboriginal Erotic Art." Artichoke, 12(1):34–6.
 Butler, Sheila. 1987. "A Sense of Place: Photography in Manitoba." Vanguard 16(2):41–2.
 Campbell, Suzan. 2001. The American West: People, Places, and Ideas. Santa Fe, NM: Western Edge Press.
 Cerdan, Alice. 2000. "girl Guides boy Scouts: Navigating by our Grandmothers, Rosalie Favell and Arthur Renwick." Cahier 43. Montréal: Galerie B-312.
 Dahle, Sigrid. 2001 February 1. “Dynamic of Riel images examined by 10 artists.” Winnipeg Free Press, 3/2/01, B:7.
 Dessureault, Pierre, Louis-Edmond Hamelin, Andrea Kunard, Daniel Chartier, and Jan-Erik Lunstrõm. 2010. Nordicité. Québec, Qc: J'ai VU.
 Di Rusio, Tonia. 1998. In Absentia. Halifax, NS: Mount Saint Vincent University Art Gallery.
 Enright, Robert. 2001 May 12. "Legends of the fall." The Globe and Mail, 2001/05/12, sec. V, p. 8.
 Eyland, Cliff. 2001. "Officialdumbing." Border Crossings 20.2(78):122-3.
 Farrell Racette, Sherry, 2011. Close Encounters: The Next 500 Years. Plug In Editions.
 Favell, Rosalie. 2000. “Dossier: Amérindiens et Métis: art et politique.” Spirale 171(mars-avril 2000):3, 6–7, 11–12.
 ——. 1994. "Living Evidence." Talking Stick 1(3):3.
 Février, Ève. 1994. “Speculum de Rosalie Favell.” Esse 25(Automne 1994):8–11.
 Fraser, Graham. 1999. “Portraits of a people.” The Globe and Mail, 20/11/99, sec. R, pp. 1, 3.
 Gessell, Paul. 2001 January 18. "The Riel thing: exhibit shows Métis leader as hero to many." The Ottawa Citizen, 2001/01/18, sec. K, pp. 1, 5.
 Gilbert, André. 2004. Self Portraits in Contemporary Canadian Photography. Éditions J’ai VU.
 Goggin, Kathleen. 1995. Rosalie Favell: Living Evidence. Montréal: Dazibao.
 Hill, Richard William, Cheryl L’Hirondelle, and Joseph Nayhowtow. 2008. The World Upside Down = Le monde à l’envers.Vancouver BC: Walter Phillips Gallery.
 Jenkner, Ingrid. 1994. Living Evidence. Regina, Saskatchewan: Dunlop Art Gallery.
 Lippard, Lucy R. "Independent Identities." Pp. 134–48 in Native American Art in the Twentieth Century, edited by W. J. Rushing III. London: Routledge.
 Madill, Shirley. 1987. A Sense of Place: Photography in Manitoba. Winnipeg: The Winnipeg Art Gallery.
 Martin, Lee-Ann, and Morgan Wood. 1999. Exposed: Aesthetics of Aboriginal Erotic Art. Regina, SK: Mackenzie Art Gallery.
 Mattes, Catherine. “Introduction.” First Voices, First Words Issue. Prairie Fire 22(3):64–80, 215.
 Melnyk, Doug. 1985. "Rosalie Favell." Vanguard 14(7):36.
 Robertson, Sheila. 1998 January 17. "Exhibition draws on family photographs." The Star-Phoenix, 17/1/98, sec. C, p. 10.
 Smith, Jaune Quick-to-See. 1997. We are One, We are Many: An Exhibition of Contemporary Native American Art. La Crosse, Wisconsin: University of Wisconsin-La Crosse.
Starling, Mike. 1997 February 20. "UW-L art gallery director hopes ‘We Are One, We Are Many’ will change attitudes about style of art." La Crosse Tribune, 1997/02/20, sec. E, p. 8.
 Tsinhnahjinnie, Hulleah J., and Veronica Passalacqua. 2006. Our People, Our Land, Our Images International Indigenous Photographers. Davis, California: The Regents of the University of California.
 Urbanowski, Greg. 1995 January 20. "Métis photographer bares her soul: polaroids reveal intimacy of relationship." Prince Albert Daily Herald, 1995/01/20, p. 9.
 Whitebear-Reed, Joyce. 1994. “Photo-Realities: photographs by First Nations photographers." Talking Stick 1(2):6.

1958 births
Living people
Artists from Ottawa
Artists from Winnipeg
Canadian women photographers
Canadian portrait photographers
20th-century Canadian photographers
20th-century Canadian women artists
21st-century Canadian photographers
21st-century Canadian women artists
Canadian Métis people
Toronto Metropolitan University alumni
University of New Mexico alumni
Carleton University alumni
Academic staff of the University of Manitoba
Institute of American Indian Arts faculty
Academic staff of Carleton University
Academic staff of the University of Ottawa
Academic staff of OCAD University
Canadian people of Scottish descent
Canadian people of English descent
20th-century women photographers
21st-century women photographers